Ku’damm 56 is a German television trilogy about the 50s youth generation in the period between the end of World War II and the German Wirtschaftswunder. It tells the story of a conservative mother and her three daughters of marriageable age. The setting is the family-owned dance school. The trilogy deals with prudish morality, the first sexual experiences of the young women, and the desire for values, underscored by the association with Nazi Germany of the mother and many of her contemporaries.

It first aired on ZDF on March 20, 21, and 23, 2016. In 2018, it was followed by a sequel mini-series, Ku'damm 59. Another sequel mini-series, Ku'damm 63 aired in March 2021.

Plot 
Berlin, 1956. The older adults are all haunted by the ghosts of their actions in the war, and a newer generation who experienced none of it are coming of age, passing judgement on the decisions of their predecessors while trying to find their own place in Germany a decade post-war.

The plot revolves around the Schöllack family, headed by the caustically critical Caterina Schöllack (Claudia Michelsen), owner and matron of Galant, the dance and etiquette school on Ku'damm, who has three daughters and exactingly high expectations for their futures. Due to her hypocritical past, she has raised them with puritanical standards to be ideal trophy housewives, and steamrolls over their desires to push them at eligible and rich men, regardless of suitability. Her school and ideals are quickly becoming dated as she grasps any opportunity to maintain the status quo and climb upward. Her husband disappeared during the war and never came home, leaving her to maintain appearances and standards. She profited from the Nazi seizure of Jewish properties, but without it, she would not have been able to provide for her family.

Eldest Helga (Maria Ehrich) is soon to escape their demanding mother's roof for married bliss. But, married life to the fussy and frigid Wolfgang is not what Helga dreamed it would be, and she descends into desperate focus on becoming the perfect housewife as a path to attaining the affection and love she desires. Her husband, Wolfgang von Boost (August Wittgenstein), is a promising young attorney on the path to become prosecutor. He has significant secrets of his own preventing him from being a full husband to Helga, and suffers attacks of conscience preventing him from doing his job. Frustrated with the futility, Wolfgang becomes volatile and unpleasant, while the increasingly unhappy Helga tries to hold up appearances.

Middle child, Monika (Sonja Gerhardt), is sweet and slow: bad at everything she does except dancing, when she feels pure joy and truly excels. A number of hard blows bring her low, as she struggles to find self worth when she wishes to fade away. Her mother pairs her with prickly Joachim Frank (Sabin Tambrea), who initially hurts her badly, though their shared gloominess and like spirits draw them back to each other. The very physical Monika finds healing through the new rock ’n’ roll dances from America and a fun, no-strings relationship with musician Freddy Donath (Trystan Pütter). Joachim is the sensitive, artistic, and unwanted second son of an extremely wealthy factory owner. Blocked from using his own talents and forced into idleness at his father's factory, Joachim has become a self-destructive and self-loathing cynic who tends to harm those around him. He becomes healthier and happier as his usefulness increases and he seeks Monika's forgiveness. The contemplative Joachim is in direct contrast with the free spirited Freddy, who loves free love, music, and takes nothing seriously, not even Monika. Monika finds herself drawn to unconventional choices and rebellion, even when it will cost her dearly and traditional paths would serve her better.

The beautiful and bright youngest, nurse Eva (Emilia Schüle), has inherited a degree of her mother's calculation and self awareness. Spending her days surrounded by hysterical and disturbed women in the mental institution she works in, Eva has become distrustful of emotions and afraid of their potential effect, preferring to suppress strong feelings which scare her. She knows herself and reality well enough to realize that the trappings of a rich and influential marriage can significantly improve her life and chances of happiness. As such, she decides to go along with her mother's plans to have her marry her much older boss, the wealthy and prestigious Professor Fassbender (Heino Ferch). While she admires and relies on his kind steadiness, she lacks attraction to him and finds herself reluctant when it comes to actually acting out her plan. Unfortunately, Eva is an emotional person and she becomes increasingly drawn to a young and handsome man, Rudi Hauer (Steve Windolf). Married to a patient, poor, and working as a football goalie, Rudi is a wildly inappropriate choice who cannot offer Eva the type of life she wants, no matter how much she wants him. Eva must find a balance between the desires of her heart and the knowledge in her head.

Background 
Monika's and her sisters' stories show what it was like for many women in a time when they were expected to marry as soon as possible and their social class was determined by the man at their side. However, the desire for a new female identity and equal rights shaped this generation.

Heike Hempel, editor-in-chief of ZDF, stated: "With Ku’damm 56 we continue our tradition of narrating history in a contemporary way. […] Ku’damm 56 shows women on their path to self-determined sexuality and equal rights."

Musical 
A musical version of the movie will debut in November 2021 in Stage Entertainment's Stage Theater des Westens.

Production 
The film was shot from July until October 2015 in Berlin. Filming locations were the duck pond at Rudolph-Wilde-Park, Haus Dannenberg in Heiligensee, on the Havel in Krienicke-Park in Haselhorst, Eiswerderbrücke, Hansaplatz, Palais am Funkturm, and Schloss Marquardt, among others. Interiors were shot in a UFA studio in Tempelhofer Feld.

References 

2010s German television miniseries
Television series set in the 1950s
2016 German television series debuts
2016 German television series endings
German-language television shows
ZDF original programming